The 1977 NCAA Division II football season, part of college football in the United States organized by the National Collegiate Athletic Association at the Division II level, began in August 1977 and concluded with the championship game on December 10 at Memorial Stadium in Wichita Falls, Texas. The Lehigh Engineers defeated the Jacksonville State Gamecocks 33–0 in the Pioneer Bowl to win their first Division II national title.

This was the last season prior to the creation of Division I-AA, now named Division I-Football Championship Subdivision (FCS), which debuted in 1978.

Conference realignment

Conference changes
 This was the final season at the Division II level for the members of five conferences: the Big Sky Conference, Mid-Eastern Athletic Conference, Ohio Valley Conference, Southwestern Athletic Conference, and Yankee Conference. After the end of play, each conference its members, alongside seven independent teams, would transition to the newly-established Division I-AA level of college football.

Membership changes

Conference standings

Conference summaries

Postseason

The 1977 NCAA Division II Football Championship playoffs were the fifth single-elimination tournament to determine the national champion of Division II college football. The championship game was held at Memorial Stadium in Wichita Falls, Texas for the second time.

Playoff bracket

* Denotes host institution
 Northern Arizona was the Big Sky runner-up; champion Boise State had a scheduling conflict.

See also
1977 NCAA Division I football season
1977 NCAA Division III football season
1977 NAIA Division I football season
1977 NAIA Division II football season

References